The Friesland-class destroyers were built for the Royal Netherlands Navy in the 1950s. Eight ships were built. They were replaced by the s in the early 1980s and seven ships were sold to the Peruvian Navy where they served until 1991. The main armament was supplied by Bofors.

The machinery was identical to that used in the American s and manufactured under licence by Werkspoor. The radar was manufactured by Hollandse Signaalapparaten.

History
After World War II, the Royal Netherlands Navy had to be rebuilt. There were different visions about what the navy should look like, opinions on the subject - or fantasies - diverged. One of the plans was based on the Royal Netherlands Navy  having no less than 48 submarine destroyers. That number, however, was quickly scaled back. For the 1947 budget, funds were included for the first time for the new ships: the so-called "Submarine Destroyer 1947". In 1948 six ships of these Holland-class destroyers were ordered, but only 4 would eventually be built. In 1948 it was announced that the Dutch navy would purchase, alongside the four "Holland-class" ships, another eight submarine destroyers. In September 1948, a new improved design was made on basis of the Holland-class destroyers, this design was at the time called "Submarine Destroyer 1949" and would later be known as the Friesland-class destroyer. Like the Holland-class destroyers the Friesland-class destroyers were designed by engineer K. de Munter, who was employed at the Bureau Scheepsbouw which fell directly under the Dutch Ministry of the Navy.

Ships
In contrast to previous Dutch Navy practice the ships were named after provinces or cities rather than admirals.

References
Notes

Sources
 Conway's All the World's Fighting Ships 1947-1995
 
 
 

 
Destroyer classes
Destroyers of the Royal Netherlands Navy

sv:Hr. Ms. Friesland (1953)